Shiva Mecchida Kannappa is a 1988 Indian Kannada-language film directed by Vijay. The film is a rehashed version of the 1954 film Bedara Kannappa, the debut film of actor Rajkumar. Produced by Raghavendra Rajkumar, the film is about the life of Kannappa, a hunter who becomes a Lord Shiva devotee; Kanappa is played by Puneeth Rajkumar in younger days and Shivarajkumar in adult life. The rest of the cast includes Geetha, Sarala Devi, C. R. Simha and Rajkumar himself playing a brief cameo role in the role of Shiva. The film has musical score by T. G. Lingappa and the dialogues and lyrics written by Chi. Udaya Shankar.

Cast

Soundtrack
The musical score by T. G. Lingappa was positively reviewed.

Release 
The film was released on 24 March 1988.

References

External source

1988 films
1980s Kannada-language films
Indian musical films
Indian biographical films
Films scored by T. G. Lingappa
Hindu mythological films
Hindu devotional films
1980s biographical films
1980s musical films
Films directed by Vijay (director)